Leptosiaphos pauliani is a species of lizard in the family Scincidae. It is found in Cameroon.

References

Leptosiaphos
Reptiles of Cameroon
Endemic fauna of Cameroon
Reptiles described in 1940
Taxa named by Fernand Angel